Jesselyn Radack (born December 12, 1970) is an American national security and human rights attorney known for her defense of whistleblowers, journalists, and hacktivists. She graduated from Brown University and Yale Law School and began her career as an Honors Program attorney at the U.S. Department of Justice.

She is notable for defending prominent whistleblowers, including National Security Agency whistleblowers Edward Snowden and Thomas Drake, each of whom was charged under the Espionage Act of 1917, as well as for her own experience as a whistleblower at the U.S. Department of Justice.

While at the Justice Department, she disclosed that the Federal Bureau of Investigation (FBI) committed an ethics violation in their interrogation of John Walker Lindh (the "American Taliban" captured during the 2001 invasion of Afghanistan) without an attorney present, and alleged that the Department of Justice attempted to suppress that information. The Lindh case was the first major terrorism prosecution after 9/11.  Her experience is chronicled in her memoir,  TRAITOR: The Whistleblower and the "American Taliban" and the documentary Silenced.

Radack is the director of National Security & Human Rights at ExposeFacts' Whistleblower and Source Protection Program.  She has been widely published and quoted regarding whistleblower, surveillance, Internet freedom and privacy. Her writing has appeared The New York Times, L.A. Times, Washington Post, Guardian, The Nation, Legal Times, and numerous law journals. She frequently appears in the press, including all the major television networks, NPR, PBS, CNN, Al Jazeera, and the BBC.

Early life and education
Radack was born in Washington, D.C., and attended Brown University. She was elected to Phi Beta Kappa in her junior year and graduated in 1992 as a triple major in American civilization, women's studies, and political science, with honors in all three majors. While in college, she was diagnosed with multiple sclerosis.

In 1995, Radack graduated from Yale Law School and, through the Attorney General's Honors Program, joined the Department of Justice. When the Department's Professional Responsibility Advisory Office (PRAO) was created in 1999, she served as a legal advisor until leaving Justice in April 2002.

John Walker Lindh case

Initial inquiry into Lindh case
On December 7, 2001, Radack received an inquiry from Justice Department counterterrorism prosecutor John DePue regarding the ethical propriety of interrogating Lindh in Afghanistan without a lawyer present. He told her that Lindh's father had retained counsel for his son. This was not known to Lindh. Radack responded that interrogating him was not authorized by law. The principle at issue was that a person represented by a lawyer cannot be contacted by agents of the Justice Department, including the FBI, without permission of that lawyer. According to Radack, her advice was approved by Claudia Flynn, then head of PRAO, and Joan Goldfrank, a senior PRAO attorney.

The FBI proceeded to question Lindh without a lawyer. DePue informed Radack of the interrogation on the 10th, and she advised him that Lindh's "interview may have to be sealed or only used for national security purposes; however, I don't have enough information yet to make that recommendation".

Radack continued to research the issue until December 20, 2001, when Flynn told her to drop the matter because Lindh had been "Mirandized". It was later learned that the FBI agent Christopher Reimann who read Lindh the Miranda warning had, when noting the right to counsel, ad-libbed: "Of course, there are no lawyers here".

U.S. government statements on Lindh's legal rights
On January 15, 2002, five weeks after the interrogation, Attorney General John Ashcroft announced that a criminal complaint was being filed against Lindh. "The subject here is entitled to choose his own lawyer", Ashcroft said, "and to our knowledge, has not chosen a lawyer at this time". On February 5, 2002, Ashcroft announced Lindh's indictment, saying that his rights "have been carefully, scrupulously honored".

In early 2004 Radack said that she disagreed with Ashcroft's view but could see its logic, that because Lindh did not pick the lawyer himself, the lawyer did not represent him at the time of interrogation and therefore the questioning did not violate Lindh's rights. "You can debate it one way or another," she said. In early 2005 Radack recalled her reaction to Ashcroft's statements more starkly: "I knew that wasn't true".

Poor performance review
On February 4, 2002, the day before the Lindh indictment was announced, Flynn gave Radack an unscheduled "blistering" performance evaluation, despite Radack having received a merit raise the year before. It covered December 27, 2000, to September 30, 2001, two months prior to the Lindh inquiry, and did not mention that case, but it criticized her legal judgment in issues related to the case and in other matters. Flynn had not yet signed the review. She advised Radack to find another job or the review would be put in Radack's official personnel file. Radack, who had planned on being a career civil servant, soon found a new job in the private sector at the law firm Hawkins, Delafield & Wood, from which she was effectively fired in November 2002 for refusing to sign an affidavit saying she did not leak the government emails, or resign.

Missing emails
On March 7, 2002, while Radack was still working at PRAO, the lead prosecutor in the Lindh case, Randy Bellows, messaged Radack that there was a court order for all of the Justice Department's internal correspondence about Lindh's interrogation. He said that he had two of her messages and asked if there were more.

Radack immediately became concerned that the court order had been deliberately concealed from her. She had written more than a dozen emails on the subject, and neither of the ones Bellows had received copies of reflected her fear that the FBI's actions had been unethical and that Lindh's confession, which was the basis for the criminal case, might have to be sealed. After checking the hard-copy file, Radack said the files were tampered with to include only three of her emails; official records indicated that only those three emails were received by the Lindh prosecutors, but which emails DOJ supplied to the court and when cannot be determined as the court records were sealed. Radack confided in a senior colleague, former U.S. Attorney Donald McKay, who examined the file and told her that it had been "purged".

With the assistance of technical support, Radack then recovered 14 email messages from her computer archives and gave them to Flynn with a cover memorandum. When Flynn asked Radack why the messages weren't in the file, Radack said she didn't know, and her supervisor said "Now I have to explain why PRAO should not look bad for not turning them over," indicating her belief that Radack had overlooked the additional correspondence when originally turning over the messages and attempted to correct her error by presenting the recovered emails while asserting ethical misconduct. Radack took home a copy of the recovered emails to ensure they wouldn't "disappear" again.

Which emails the Department of Justice supplied to the court, and when, cannot be determined directly because the court placed them under seal. In March 2003 investigative journalist Jane Mayer of The New Yorker reported that "[a]n official list compiled by the prosecution confirms that the Justice Department did not hand over Radack's most critical e-mail in which she questioned the viability of Lindh's confession until after her confrontation with Flynn".

On December 31, 2003, Radack requested the court appoint a special prosecutor to probe the alleged suppression of the emails. The government responded that it had supplied the emails to the court in its initial response to the court order seeking them, i.e., on March 1, 2002. The description of the 24 documents (probably including duplicates) provided to the court at that time matches Radack's emails, including the one that states interviewing Lindh is not authorized by law. DePue, the recipient of the emails, also had copies and states that they were submitted to the court. The judge rejected Radack's request as "impertinent".

In 2004 Radack filed suit against the government (see below). In 2005, the court found that "[t]hough Flynn informed Radack that she would send the emails to Bellows, Radack maintains that she had a 'good faith belief' that this never occurred...Radack was mistaken, for in filings submitted to the Virginia District Court on March 1, 2002, and March 11, 2002, Bellows turned over thirty-three PRAO-related documents, including Radack's fourteen emails, ex parte and under seal, for in camera review".

Disclosure to Newsweek of emails believed to have been purged
Radack resigned from the Justice Department on April 5, 2002. In June 2002 she heard a broadcast on NPR stating that the Department said they had never taken the position that Lindh was entitled to counsel during his interrogation. She later wrote, "I knew this statement was not true. It also indicated to me that the Justice Department must not have turned over my e-mails to the Lindh court ... because I did not believe the Department would have the temerity to make public statements contradicted by its own court filings, even if those filings were in camera." She reasoned that "disclosure of my e-mails would advance compliance with the Lindh court's discovery order while also exposing gross mismanagement and abuse of authority by my superiors at the Justice Department." After hearing the broadcast, Radack sent the emails to Michael Isikoff, a Newsweek reporter, who had been interviewed in the NPR story. He then wrote an article about the Lindh case emails, quoting Radack but not naming her as the source of what he called "internal e-mails obtained by Newsweek." 

Radack has said she did not turn the documents over to the court or prosecutors at the time she recovered them because she felt intimidated by Flynn, who had told her to drop the matter. Later, no longer working in government, she reasoned, "I couldn't go to the court because Justice Department lawyers would argue (as they did when I eventually did try to tell my story to the court) that I had no standing. I couldn't go to a Member of Congress because, as a resident of the District of Columbia, I didn't have a voting representative. What I could do is disclose my story to the press--a judicially-sanctioned way of exposing wrongdoing under the Whistleblower Protection Act of 1989, which provides protection to federal government employees who blow the whistle on what they reasonably believe evidences a violation of any law, rule, or regulation; gross mismanagement; or an abuse of authority".

Radack and some others believe her disclosure of the emails may have contributed to the plea agreement that led to a sentence of 20 years instead of possible multiple life sentences for Lindh. The plea deal was reached on July 15, 2002, a month after the Newsweek article on the emails appeared online and just hours before the hearing to consider the motions to suppress the Lindh interviews was set to begin. According to Lindh defense attorneys, the prosecution first approached them about a plea deal around the beginning of June. On June 14, the day before the emails were disclosed, and June 17, the Lindh defense filed their arguments to suppress all the interviews conducted in Afghanistan, including the ones that Radack had advised might have to be suppressed. The defense reasoning was different from Radack's; it did not assert that Lindh was represented by a lawyer at the time, which was the basis for Radack's advice in the emails.

Justice Department actions against Radack
On June 19, 2002, the Lindh court ordered the Justice Department to file a pleading "addressing whether any documents ordered protected by the Court were disclosed by any person bound by an Order of this court". The Justice Department launched a criminal investigation of Radack that remained open for 15 months. No potential criminal charge was ever specified, but as leaking is not a crime, the most likely charge would have been theft of government property, as she had taken home copies of her emails before she resigned from the PRAO, and her PRAO supervisor later insinuated she was suspected of having removed other files that had gone missing. Radack says an agent of the Department of Justice's Office of the Inspector General (OIG) told her new employer and coworkers that she was under criminal investigation and would steal client files.

Radack believes the OIG agent pressured her employer to fire her. The firm was initially supportive, but after it obtained phone records of calls between Newsweek writer Isikoff and the firm's office showing that Radack appeared to be the leaker of government emails, that changed. A partner in the firm, which represented mainly government bond issuers, told her they could not be perceived to have an ex-government lawyer who broke confidence when she thought the client was wrong. When she continued to refuse to sign a statement that she did not leak the emails, she was placed on paid and then unpaid leave.

When Radack was granted unemployment benefits, her now-former employer was assisted by the Justice Department, she says, in challenging the benefits on the grounds of her alleged misconduct and insubordination. She won the appeal.

The Lindh court issued an order on November 6, 2002, concluding that Radack's disclosure did not violate any order of the Court, but this order was not made available to Radack until two years later.

The Department of Justice notified Radack that the criminal investigation was closed on September 11, 2003. On October 31, 2003, the Department of Justice's Office of Professional Responsibility (OPR) sent letters to the bar associations of the two jurisdictions in which she was licensed to practice law referring her for a possible ethics violation. The referrals proposed that in disclosing the emails she may have knowingly revealed information protected by attorney-client privilege. There is disagreement about whether the government or the public is the client of government attorneys. Radack bypassed that issue by invoking the Whistleblower Protection Act (WPA), which she argues provides the legal basis for an exception to attorney-client privilege, i.e., for disclosure when permitted or authorized by law. The Justice Department responded that the WPA may not apply to former employees, and that it does not authorize any disclosure, only prevents retaliatory personnel actions for certain disclosures.

OPR did not follow its own policies in making the referrals, according to Radack, including in not allowing her to formally respond to its findings. She has contrasted the way she was treated by the Department of Justice and the way the department attorneys who authored the memos giving a purported legal basis for waterboarding and other controversial interrogation methods were treated.

There was never any serious investigation of how Radack's emails disappeared from the PRAO file, she believes, a conclusion reached in part because no investigator questioned her about it. She says the OIG told her attorney they had "looked into" her allegations and they were "not going to pursue it".

The criminal investigation and subsequent ethics referrals prevented Radack from finding suitable work as an attorney for years, she says. The Maryland Bar dismissed the referral February 23, 2005. At the District of Columbia Bar, the referral was not resolved until 2011.

Radack has said that one or more anonymous Justice Department officials "smeared" her in the media as a "traitor", "turncoat", and "terrorist sympathizer" "to alienate me from all my neighbors, all my friends", sometimes specifying it was in The New York Times. In May 2003, Eric Lichtblau reported at The New York Times that "Government officials suspect she is a turncoat who leaked documents on one of their most important investigations, the John Walker Lindh case."

For a time beginning in 2003, Bruce Fein, a noted constitutional scholar and former associate deputy attorney general under Ronald Reagan, represented Radack pro bono. Rick Robinson of Fulbright & Jaworski and Mona Lyons also represented her.

Congressional questions
At a May 7, 2003, hearing of the Senate Judiciary Committee, Senator Ted Kennedy questioned Michael Chertoff, who was before the committee as a nominee for a circuit court judgeship, and who, as an  Assistant Attorney General during the period in which Lindh was prosecuted, headed the Justice Department's Criminal Division. Kennedy later said that Chertoff's initial answers about Radack's case were "nonresponsive, evasive and hyper-technical" but that after follow-up questions, Chertoff provided more "direct and forthcoming" answers.

On May 22, Kennedy issued a statement saying, "I am concerned about inconsistencies in the responses Mr. Chertoff provided with respect to the debate over the legality of the interrogation of John Walker Lindh. … I understand that Mr. Chertoff does not believe that Mr. DePue played a major role in the Lindh investigation and prosecution, and does not understand why DePue asked PRAO for its opinion on this matter. Nevertheless, Mr. Chertoff should have fully shared his knowledge regarding this situation from the outset, rather than deny that PRAO was asked for its opinion." Kennedy also said, "Mr. Chertoff has told me that [he] has no knowledge of the facts surrounding Ms. Radack's employment, performance, or departure from the Department, and I take him at his word. Nevertheless, I remain very concerned about Ms. Radack's situation. According to press reports—and the Department has never issued any statement disputing them—Ms. Radack was in effect fired for providing legal advice on a matter involving ethical duties and civil liberties that higher-level officials at the Department disagreed with." In the same statement, Kennedy said he had submitted questions in March to Attorney General Ashcroft about Radack having been "in effect fired for providing legal advice on a matter involving ethical duties and civil liberties that higher-level officials at the Department disagreed with."

On May 23, by a vote of 13 to 0, the committee sent Chertoff's judicial nomination to the full Senate for confirmation. Six Democrats, however, voted "present," saying they wanted more time to review Radack's accusations.

Whistleblower defense lawyer, after DOJ
In the mid-2000s, Radack served on the D.C. Bar Legal Ethics Committee and worked with the ABA Task Force on Treatment of Enemy Combatants.

Law office of Congressman Alan Grayson

From 2006–2008, she worked as a lawyer in the law firm owned by of Congressman Alan Grayson, "Grayon and Kubli", representing government contractors blowing the whistle on fraud in the reconstruction of Iraq.

Government Accountability Project

From 2009–2014, Radack was Homeland Security & Human Rights Director at the Government Accountability Project.

Institute for Public Accuracy

Since 2015, she has been National Security & Human Rights Director of the Whistleblower and Source Protection Program (WHISPeR) at ExposeFacts. Radack is one of the attorneys for National Security Agency whistleblower Edward Snowden. She was also one of the attorneys who represented National Security Agency whistleblower Thomas Andrews Drake, with whom she won the 2011 Sam Adams Award, given annually by the Sam Adams Associates for Integrity in Intelligence. They also both won the 2012 Hugh M. Hefner First Amendment Award. She is also the lawyer of whistleblower Brandon Bryant. Her writing has appeared in The New York Times, Wall Street Journal, Los Angeles Times, The Washington Post, The Guardian, The Nation, Salon, and numerous law journals. She maintains a blog at Daily Kos.

On May 9, 2019, Radack described her client Daniel Everette Hale, an analyst for the National Geospatial-Intelligence Agency, as a "classic whistleblower".

See also

Sibel Edmonds
List of whistleblowers
Whistleblower Protection Act

References

External links
On Julian Assange's address to the UNGA, human rights, and the persecution of whistleblowers  Jesselyn Radack speaks to RT (TV network), September 27, 2012.
Disharmonic Convergence of Free Speech Free Fall  by Jesselyn Radack (The Whistleblogger/ 2012), Government Accountability Project (GAP), on September 27, 2012.
Jesselyn Radack:The Canary in the Coalmine, 2004.
DailyKos blog and profile
Silenced: documentary trailer published via YouTube

Living people
Yale Law School alumni
Brown University alumni
American whistleblowers
1970 births
United States Department of Justice lawyers
Lawyers from Washington, D.C.
American human rights activists
Women human rights activists